Duttaphrynus crocus is a species of toads in the family Bufonidae endemic to the Rakhine State, Myanmar.
Its natural habitat is primary evergreen forest. It is threatened by habitat loss (logging).

References

crocus
Endemic fauna of Myanmar
Amphibians of Myanmar
Amphibians described in 2003
Taxonomy articles created by Polbot